Chhatoh is a village and corresponding community development block in Salon tehsil of Rae Bareli district, Uttar Pradesh, India. It is located 43 km from Raebareli, the district headquarters. As of 2011, Chhatoh has a population of 3,999 people, in 749 households. It has 3 primary schools and one veterinary hospital but no healthcare facilities for humans. In addition to being the block headquarters, Chhatoh is also the headquarters of a nyaya panchayat that includes 8 other villages.

The 1951 census recorded Chhatoh as comprising 10 hamlets, with a total population of 1,386 people (682 male and 704 female), in 343 households and 341 physical houses. The area of the village was given as 1,569 acres. 28 residents were literate, 26 male and 2 female. The village was listed as belonging to the pargana of Rokha and the thana of Mustafabad.

The 1961 census recorded Chhatoh as comprising 14 hamlets, with a total population of 1,569 people (770 male and 799 female), in 396 households and 359 physical houses. The area of the village was given as 1,569 acres and it had access to electricity at that point.

The 1981 census recorded Chhatoh as having a population of 2,060 people, in 581 households, and having an area of 613.51 hectares. The main staple foods were listed as wheat and rice.

The 1991 census recorded Chhatoh as having a total population of 2,527 people (1,250 male and 1,277 female), in 556 households and 556 physical houses. The area of the village was listed as 613 hectares. Members of the 0-6 age group numbered 518, or 20.5% of the total; this group was 50% male (257) and 50% female (261). Members of scheduled castes made up 40.4% of the village's population, while no members of scheduled tribes were recorded. The literacy rate of the village was 19% (415 men and 63 women). 765 people were classified as main workers (662 men and 103 women), while 277 people were classified as marginal workers (3 men and 274 women); the remaining 1,485 residents were non-workers. The breakdown of main workers by employment category was as follows: 574 cultivators (i.e. people who owned or leased their own land); 149 agricultural labourers (i.e. people who worked someone else's land in return for payment); 0 workers in livestock, forestry, fishing, hunting, plantations, orchards, etc.; 0 in mining and quarrying; 2 household industry workers;  2 workers employed in other manufacturing, processing, service, and repair roles; 0 construction workers; 3 employed in trade and commerce; 0 employed in transport, storage, and communications; and 35 in other services.

Villages
Chhatoh CD block has the following 58 villages:

References

Villages in Raebareli district
Community development blocks in India